Snowdonia or Eryri, is a mountainous region in northwestern Wales and a national park of  in area. It was the first to be designated of the three national parks in Wales, in 1951.

Name and extent

The term  first appeared in a manuscript in the 9th-century , in an account of the downfall of the semi-legendary 5th-century king  (Vortigern).

Before the boundaries of the national park were designated, Snowdonia was generally used to refer to a smaller area, namely the upland area of northern  centred on the Snowdon massif, whereas the national park covers an area more than twice that size, extending far to the south into . This is apparent in books published prior to 1951, such as the classic travelogue Wild Wales by George Borrow (1862) and The Mountains of Snowdonia by H. Carr & G. Lister (1925). F. J. North, as editor of the book Snowdonia (1949), states "When the Committee delineated provisional boundaries, they included areas some distance beyond Snowdonia proper".

In 2020, an e-petition calling for the removal of the English names was put forward to the Senedd. The petition was rejected as the devolved legislature stated it was the responsibility of the national park authority itself.

On 28 April 2021, Gwynedd councillor John Pughe Roberts put forward a motion for the names Snowdonia National Park and Snowdon to be replaced with the Welsh names  and  respectively, stating it as a "question of respect for the Welsh language". The motion was not considered and delayed, as the national park authority already appointed a "Welsh Place Names Task and Finish Group" to investigate the issue. The park authority however cannot compel other bodies and/or individuals to stop using the English names, with the proposals facing some criticism.

In April 2021, an e-petition was launched calling for ditching Snowdon and Snowdonia National Park for their Welsh equivalents. By June 2021, more than 5,300 people signed the petition.

In May 2021, following the dismissal of the motion, YouGov conducted a poll on Snowdon's name. 60% of Welsh adults supported the English name Snowdon, compared to 30% wanting the Welsh name . Separating by language, 59% of Welsh speakers preferred the Welsh name, while 37% wanted Snowdon to not be scrapped entirely. 69% of non-Welsh speakers firmly supported Snowdon as the Mountain's name. The proposals to rename Snowdon are usually accompanied with proposals to rename Snowdonia.

The national park authority described the decision as "decisive action" and the authority's head of culture heritage stated that Welsh place names were part of the area's "special qualities" and that other public bodies, English-language press and filming companies have used the Welsh-language names. Prior to the decision, the park already included the Welsh names on English-language documents followed by the English names in parentheses. Although previous proposals advocated for Snowdonia to be scrapped entirely, the name Snowdonia is set in law, therefore the authority has the legal requirement to also use it in official statutory documents. The authority announced they are to conduct a review of the authority's branding in 2023 taking into account the new approach to Welsh place names.

Snowdonia National Park
Snowdonia National Park, was established in 1951 as the third national park in Britain, following the Peak District and the Lake District. Snowdonia National Park covers parts of the counties of Gwynedd and Conwy.

The park is governed by the Snowdonia National Park Authority, which is made up of local government and Welsh Government representatives, and its main offices are at Penrhyndeudraeth. Unlike national parks in other countries, Snowdonia (and other such parks in Britain) is made up of both public and private lands under a central planning authority. The makeup of land ownership at Snowdonia is as follows:

More than 26,000 people live within the park, of whom 58.6% could speak Welsh in 2011.

While most of the land is either open or mountainous land, there is a significant amount of agricultural activity within the park.

Since the local government re-organisation of 1998, the park lies partly in the county of Gwynedd, and partly in the county borough of Conwy. It is governed by the 18-member Snowdonia National Park Authority; nine members are appointed by Gwynedd, three by Conwy, and the remaining six by the Welsh Government to represent the national interest. Unusually, Snowdonia National Park has a hole in the middle, around the town of Blaenau Ffestiniog, a slate quarrying centre. This was deliberately excluded from the park when it was set up to allow the development of new light industry to replace the reduced slate industry. (There is a similar situation in the Peak District National Park where the boundaries were drawn to exclude large built-up areas and industrial sites from the park with the town of Buxton and the adjacent quarries outside but surrounded on three sides by the park.) 

The Snowdonia Society is a registered charity formed in 1967; it is a voluntary group of people with an interest in the area and its protection.

Amory Lovins led the successful 1970s opposition to stop Rio Tinto digging up the area for a massive mine.

Geology

The geology of Snowdonia is key to the area's character. Glaciation during a succession of ice ages, has carved from a heavily faulted and folded succession of sedimentary and igneous rocks, a distinctive rocky landscape. The last ice age ended only just over 11,500 years ago, leaving a legacy of features attractive to visitors but which have also played a part in the development of geological science and continue to provide a focus for educational visits. Visiting Cwm Idwal in 1841 Charles Darwin realised that the landscape was the product of glaciation. The bedrock dates largely from the Cambrian and Ordovician periods with intrusions of Ordovician and Silurian age associated with the Caledonian Orogeny. There are smaller areas of Silurian age sedimentary rocks in the south and northeast and of Cenozoic era strata on the Cardigan Bay coast though the latter are concealed by more recent deposits. Low grade metamorphism of Cambrian and Ordovician mudstones has resulted in the slates, the extraction of which once formed the mainstay of the area's economy.

Geography

Mountains 
The principal ranges of the traditional Snowdonia are the Snowdon massif itself, the Glyderau, the Carneddau, the Moelwynion and the Moel Hebog range. All of Wales' 3000ft mountains are to be found within the first three of these massifs and are most popular with visitors. To their south within the wider national park are the Rhinogydd and the Cadair Idris and Aran Fawddwy ranges. Besides these well-defined areas are a host of mountains which are less readily grouped though various guidebook writers have assigned them into groups such as the 'Arenigs', the 'Tarrens' and the 'Dyfi hills'.

Snowdon's summit at 1085 metres (3560') is the highest in Wales and the highest in Britain south of the Scottish Highlands.

Rivers and lakes 
Rivers draining the area empty directly into Cardigan Bay are typically short and steep. A series of rivers drain to the north coast. Largest of these is the Conwy on the park's eastern margin which along with the  drains into Conwy Bay. A part of the east of the national park is within the upper Dee (Dyfrydwy) catchment and includes Llyn Tegid, the largest natural waterbody in Wales. A fuller list of the rivers and tributaries within the area is found at List of rivers of Wales.

There are few natural waterbodies of any size in Wales; Snowdonia is home to most. There are numerous small lakes occupying glacial cirques owing to the former intensity of glacial action in Snowdonia.

There are two large wholly man-made bodies of water in the area,  and  whilst numerous of the natural lakes have had their levels artificially raised to different degrees.  reservoir and  Power Station's  are two cases where natural tarns have been dammed as part of pumped storage hydro-electric schemes.
A fuller list of the lakes within the area is found at List of lakes of Wales.

Coast 
The national park meets the Irish Sea coast within Cardigan Bay between the Dovey estuary in the south and the  estuary. These two locations sport two of the largest sand/shingle spits in Wales. The major indentations of the Dovey,  and  estuaries are characterised by large expanses of intertidal sands and coastal marsh which are especially important for wildlife (- see natural history section). The northern tip of the national park extends to the north coast of Wales at  Point, west of  where precipitous cliffs have led to the road and railway negotiating the spot in tunnel.

Settlements
There are only three towns within the park boundary though several more immediately beyond it.  is the most populous followed by Bala on the eastern boundary and then Harlech overlooking Tremadog Bay. More populous than these is the town of Blaenau Ffestiniog which is within an exclave, that is to say it is surrounded by the national park but excluded from it whilst the towns of Tywyn and Barmouth on the Cardigan Bay coast are within coastal exclaves.  in the east, Machynlleth in the south and Porthmadog and Penrhyndeudraeth in the west are immediately beyond the boundary but still identified with the park, indeed the last of these hosts the headquarters of the Snowdonia National Park Authority. Similarly the local economies of towns of Conwy, Bethesda, and Llanberis in the north are inseparably linked to the national park as they provide multiple visitor services. The lower terminus of the Snowdon Mountain Railway is at Llanberis.

Transport

Roads
Six primary routes serve Snowdonia, the busiest of which is the A55, a dual carriageway which runs along the north coast and provides strategic road access to the northern part of the national park. It exits the park a few miles to the southeast near . The A5 was built as a mail coach road by Thomas Telford between London and Holyhead; it enters the park near  and leaves it near Bethesda.

Railways
The double track North Wales Coast Line passes along the northern boundary of the park between Conwy and Bangor briefly entering it at  Point where it is in tunnel. Stations serve the communities of Conwy, Penmaenmawr, Llanfairfechan and Bangor. The single-track Conwy Valley Line runs south from Llandudno Junction, entering the park north of Betws-y-coed which is served by a station then west up the Lledr valley by way of further stations at Pont-y-pant, Dolwyddelan and Roman Bridge. After passing through a tunnel the passenger line now terminates at Blaenau Ffestiniog railway station. Prior to 1961 the route continued as the Bala and Ffestiniog Railway via Trawsfynydd to Bala joining another former route along the Dee valley which ran southwest via Dolgellau to join the still extant coastal Cambrian Line south of Barmouth. The Pwllheli branch of the Cambrian Line splits from the Aberystwyth branch at Dovey Junction and continues via stations at Aberdovey, Tywyn, Tonfanau, Llwyngwril, Fairbourne and Morfa Mawddach to Barmouth where it crosses the Mawddach estuary by the Grade II* listed wooden Barmouth Bridge, a structure which also provides for walkers and cyclists. Further stations serve Llanaber, Tal-y-bont, Dyffryn Ardudwy, Llanbedr, Pensarn and Llandanwg before reaching Harlech. Tygwyn, Talsarnau and Llandecwyn stations are the last before the line exits the park as it crosses the Dwyryd estuary via Pont Briwet and turns westwards bound for Pwllheli via Penrhyndeudraeth, Porthmadog and Criccieth.

Many sections of dismantled railway are now used by walking and cycling routes and are described elsewhere. The Bala Lake Railway is a heritage railway which has been established along a section of the former mainline route between Bala and Llanuwchllyn. Other heritage railways occupy sections of former mineral lines, often narrow gauge and are described in a separate section.

Buses
The national park is served by a growing bus network, branded Sherpa'r Wyddfa (formerly Snowdon Sherpa). Together with the TrawsCymru network of buses this provides an car-free option to tourists and locals wishing to travel across the National Park. 

The network was relaunched in July 2022 with a new brand, Sherpa'r Wyddfa, to reflect the National Park's new push for the promotion of Welsh place names. As such the publicity and websites for the newly branded service only use these Welsh names, even for English language users.

Climate

Snowdonia is one of the wettest parts of the United Kingdom; Crib Goch in Snowdonia is the wettest spot in the United Kingdom, with an average rainfall of  a year over the 30-year period prior to the mid-2000s. (There is a rainfall gauge at 713 metres, 2340' on the slopes below Crib Goch.)

History 
The earliest evidence for human occupation of the area dates from around 4000 - 3000 BCE with extensive traces of prehistoric field systems evident in the landscape. Within these are traces of irregular enclosures and hut circles. There are burial chambers of Neolithic and Bronze Age such as Bryn Cader Faner and Iron Age hillforts such as Bryn y Castell near Ffestiniog.

The region was finally conquered by the Romans by AD 77–78. Remains of Roman marching camps and practice camps are evident. There was a Roman fort and amphitheatre at Tomen y Mur. Roads are known to have connected with Segontium (Caernarfon) and Deva Victrix (Chester) and include the northern reaches of Sarn Helen.

There are numerous memorial stones of Early Christian affinity dating from the post-Roman period. The post-Roman hillfort of Dinas Emrys also dates to this time. Churches were introduced to the region in the 5th and 6th centuries. Llywelyn the Great and Llywelyn ap Gruffudd had various stone castles constructed to protect their borders and trade routes. Edward I built several castles around the margins including those at Harlech and Conwy for military and administrative reasons. Most are now protected within a World Heritage Site. Some of Snowdonia's many stone walls date back to this period too.

The 18th century saw the start of industrial exploitation of the area's resources, assisted by the appearance in the late part of the century of turnpike trusts making it more accessible. The engineer Thomas Telford left a legacy of road and railway construction in and around Snowdonia. A new harbour at Porthmadog linked to slate quarries at Ffestiniog via a narrow gauge railway. At its peak in the 19th century the slate industry employed around 12,000 men. A further 1000 were employed in stone quarrying at Graiglwyd and Penmaenmawr. Mining for copper, iron and gold was undertaken during the 18th and 19th centuries, leaving a legacy of mine and mill ruins today. Ruins of the gold industry are found at Cefn Coch on the Dolmelynllyn estate.

Natural history

The park's entire coastline is a Special Area of Conservation, which runs from the Llŷn Peninsula down the mid-Wales coast, the latter containing valuable sand dune systems.

The park's natural forests are of the mixed deciduous type, the commonest tree being the Welsh oak. Birch, ash, mountain-ash and hazel are also common. The park also contains some large (planted) coniferous forested areas such as Gwydir Forest near Betws-y-Coed, although some areas, once harvested, are now increasingly being allowed to regrow naturally.

Flora
Northern Snowdonia is the only place in Britain where the Snowdon lily (Gagea serotina), an arctic–alpine plant, is found and the only place in the world where the Snowdonia hawkweed Hieracium snowdoniense grows.

One of the major problems facing the park in recent years has been the growth of Rhododendron ponticum. This fast-growing invasive species has a tendency to take over and stifle native species. It can form massive towering growths and has a companion fungus that grows on its roots producing toxins that are poisonous to any local flora and fauna for a seven-year period after the Rhododendron infestations have been eradicated. As a result, there are a number of desolate landscapes.

Fauna
Mammals in the park include otters, polecats, feral goats, and pine martens. Birds include raven, red-billed chough, peregrine, osprey, merlin and the red kite. The rainbow-coloured Snowdon beetle (Chrysolina cerealis) is only found in northern Snowdonia.

Conservation designations 
Snowdonia has a particularly high number of protected sites in respect of its diverse ecology; nearly 20% of its total area is protected by UK and European law. Half of that area was set aside by the government under the European Habitats Directive as a Special Area of Conservation. There are a large number of Sites of special scientific interest (or 'SSSIs'), designated both for fauna and flora but also in some cases for geology. Nineteen of these sites are managed as national nature reserves by Natural Resources Wales. The park also contains twelve Special Areas of Conservation (or 'SACs'), three Special Protection Areas (or 'SPAs') and three Ramsar sites. Some are wholly within the park boundaries, others straddle it to various degrees.

Sites of Special Scientific Interest

National nature reserves 
The following NNRs are either wholly or partly within the park:
 (in multiple parts),  (in 2 parts),  and Snowdon.

Special Areas of Conservation 
 Forest Mines (north of ) and a part of the  / Berwyn and South Clwyd Mountains SAC.

Special Protection Areas 

Ramsar sites 
The three designated Ramsar sites are the Dyfi Biosphere (Cors Fochno and Dyfi), Cwm Idwal and Llyn Tegid (Bala Lake).

Economy 
The area's economy was traditionally centred upon farming and from the early 19th century increasingly on mining and quarrying. Tourism has become an increasingly significant part of Snowdonia's economy during the 20th and 21st centuries.

Hill farming
The extensive farming of sheep remains central to Snowdonia's farming economy.

Forestry
Significant sections of the park were afforested during the 20th century for timber production. Major conifer plantations include Dyfi Forest, Coed y Brenin Forest between Dolgellau and Trawsfynydd, Penllyn Forest south of Bala, Beddgelert Forest and Gwydyr (or Gwydir) Forest near Betws-y-Coed which is managed as a forest park by Natural Resources Wales.

Slate industry
The region was once the most important producer of slate in the world. Some production continues but at a much reduced level from its peak. The park boundaries are drawn such that much of the landscape affected by slate quarrying and mining lies immediately outside of the designated area.

Energy production
Construction of a nuclear power station beside Llyn Trawsfynydd began in 1959 with the first power produced in 1965. The site was operational until 1991 though it continues as an employer during its decommissioning phase. Pumped storage hydroelectric schemes are in operation at Llanberis and Ffestiniog.

Tourism 
Research indicates that there were 3.67 million visitors to Snowdonia National Park in 2013, with approximately 9.74 million tourist days spent in the park during that year. Total tourist expenditure was £433.6 million in 2013.

Hiking

Many of the hikers in the area concentrate on Snowdon itself. It is regarded as a fine mountain, but at times gets very crowded; in addition the Snowdon Mountain Railway runs to the summit.

However, there are also some spectacular walks in Snowdonia on the lower mountains, and they tend to be relatively unfrequented. Among hikers' favourites are Y Garn (east of Llanberis) along the ridge to Elidir Fawr; Mynydd Tal-y-Mignedd (west of Snowdon) along the Nantlle Ridge to Mynydd Drws-y-Coed; Moelwyn Mawr (west of Blaenau Ffestiniog); and Pen Llithrig y Wrach north of Capel Curig. Further south are Y Llethr in the Rhinogydd, and Cadair Idris near Dolgellau.

A large part of the park is also covered by right to roam laws.

Recreational routes
The Wales Coast Path runs within the park between Machynlleth and Penrhyndeudraeth, save for short sections of coast in the vicinity of Tywyn and Barmouth which are excluded from the park. It touches the park boundary again at Penmaen-bach Point on the north coast. An inland alternative exists between Llanfairfechan and Conwy, wholly within the park. The North Wales Path which predates the WCP, enters the park north of Bethesda and follows a route broadly parallel to the north coast visiting Aber Falls and the Sychnant Pass before exiting the park on the descent from Conwy Mountain. The Cambrian Way is a long-distance trail between Cardiff and Conwy which passes through the national park. It was officially recognised in 2019, and is now depicted on Ordnance Survey maps.

References

External links 

 Eryri National Park Authority
 Snowdonia Tourism
 Snowdonia Society

 
National parks in Wales
Geology of Wales
Articles containing video clips
Mountain ranges of Wales
Dark sky preserves in Wales
International Dark Sky Reserves